he 1902 Geneva Covenanters football team was an American football team that represented Geneva College as an independent during the 1902 college football season. Led by third-year head coach Samuel G. Craig, the team compiled a record of 7–0, achieving Geneva's first undefeated season.

Schedule

References

Geneva
Geneva Golden Tornadoes football seasons
College football undefeated seasons
Geneva Covenanters football